Chiusi della Verna is a comune (municipality) in the Province of Arezzo in the Italian region Tuscany, located about  east of Florence and about  north of Arezzo. It is in the Casentino traditional region.

Chiusi della Verna borders the following municipalities: Bagno di Romagna, Bibbiena, Caprese Michelangelo, Castel Focognano, Chitignano, Pieve Santo Stefano, Poppi, Subbiano, Verghereto.

In the frazione La Verna is the famous Sanctuary of St. Francis.

Demographics

Sister cities
 Helmstadt, Germany

References

External links
 Official website 

Cities and towns in Tuscany